In enzymology, an erythrulose reductase is an enzyme that catalyzes the chemical reaction

erythritol + NADP+  D-erythrulose + NADPH + H+

Thus, the two substrates of this enzyme are erythritol and NADP+, whereas its 3 products are D-erythrulose, NADPH, and H+.

This enzyme belongs to the family of oxidoreductases, specifically those acting on the CH-OH group of donor with NAD+ or NADP+ as acceptor. The systematic name of this enzyme class is erythritol:NADP+ oxidoreductase. This enzyme is also called D-erythrulose reductase.

References

 

EC 1.1.1
NADPH-dependent enzymes
Enzymes of unknown structure